North Carolina's 7th congressional district election, 2010 was an election held to determine who would represent North Carolina's 7th congressional district in the United States House of Representatives during the 112th Congress. The candidates were incumbent Democrat Mike McIntyre and Republican  former United States Marine Corps second lieutenant Ilario Pantano.  Mike McIntyre defeated Ilario Pantano, winning a seventh term in the United States House of Representatives, 54% to 46%.  It was McIntyre's closest reelection campaign to date.

Background
North Carolina's 7th District is located in Southeastern North Carolina, stretching from the Sandhills to Wilmington.  The district has a Cook PVI rating of R+5, meaning the district is slightly more conservative than average.  The 7th district was won by Republican President George W. Bush in 2004 by a large margin and Republican Senator John McCain in 2008 by a slimmer margin.

The 7th district race was especially competitive in 2010 due to uncertainty about the nation's economy and negative approval of the Democratic Party and President Barack Obama.  Mike McIntyre, a six-term conservative Democrat from Lumberton, supported the American Recovery and Reinvestment Act of 2009.  However, McIntyre opposed most of the other major pieces of legislation passed by Democrats in the 111th Congress, including the American Clean Energy and Security Act and the Patient Protection and Affordable Care Act.  Pantano used McIntyre's vote in favor of the stimulus bill and his vote to elect Nancy Pelosi as Speaker of the House to attack him, while McIntyre spun Pantano's association with Wall Street against him.  Pantano was already a controversial figure after he was accused of shooting two unarmed Iraqis while serving in Iraq in 2004.

In the general election, McIntyre was endorsed by the National Rifle Association, the United States Chamber of Commerce, and the National Right to Life Committee.

Candidates
 Mike McIntyre, Democrat, incumbent Representative
 Ilario Pantano, Republican, former marine

Polling

Primary Election Results
Ilario Pantano upset former 7th district Republican congressional candidate Will Breazeale.  Breazeale lost to McIntyre in 2008 with only 32% of the vote to McIntyre's 68%.  Breazeale endorsed Mike McIntyre after he lost 2010's Republican primary to Ilario Pantano.

Mike McIntyre was unopposed in the Democratic primary.

General Election Results
Mike McIntyre won reelection by a slim margin compared to his last few elections, with 53.7% of the vote. Pantano did well in the Wilmington suburbs and nearly claimed victory in New Hanover and Cumberland Counties, but McIntyre's 44-point margin of victory in Robeson County and strong showings in other rural counties put him over the top.

*County is not entirely located within the 7th district.

References

United States House of Representatives
2010 7
North Carolina 2010 07